Sourp Haroutiun is an Armenian Apostolic chapel in Ayios Dhometios, Nicosia, Cyprus.

The chapel is located in the second Armenian cemetery to the west of Ayios Dhometios, Nicosia and was built in 1938 by rich businessman Haroutiun Bohdjalian, who was later buried in this cemetery,.

The cemetery has been in use as a burial place since 1931. In 1963 the remains of about 100 persons buried in the old Armenian cemetery near Ledra Palace were transferred here and buried in a mass grave. In 1974, following the Turkish invasion, it fell within the UN buffer zone and very near the cease-fire line. As a result, no liturgies have been held there since 1974 and, until 2007, visits were allowed on one Sunday per month (it was later increased to two Sundays per month). Thanks to the efforts of Armenian MP Vartkes Mahdessian, since 2007 visits are allowed every Sunday noon.

The cemetery was cleared and restored by the UNFICYP in 2005. In early 2010 the chapel was restored with the hope of holding liturgies there in the near future.

References

Chapels in Cyprus
Armenian diaspora in Cyprus
Armenian churches in Cyprus